Olive Ann Burns (July 17, 1924 – July 4, 1990) was an American writer from Georgia best known for her single completed novel, Cold Sassy Tree, published in 1984.

Background
Olive Ann Burns was born in Banks County, Georgia.  Her father was a farmer but was forced to sell his farm in 1931 during the Great Depression.  The Burns family then moved to Commerce, Georgia. Burns attended Mercer University, where she wrote for the college magazine.  Her sophomore year she transferred to the University of North Carolina at Chapel Hill, where she majored in journalism.

Career
Burns worked for the Atlanta Journal and wrote under the pseudonym "Amy Larkin".  She married Andy Sparks, a fellow journalist.  In 1971 Burns began writing down family stories as dictated by her parents.  In 1975 she was diagnosed with lymphoma and began to change the family stories into a novel that would later become Cold Sassy Tree.  The novel was finally published eight years after it was begun, in 1984.  Burns received so many letters pleading for a follow-up novel that she began writing Leaving Cold Sassy.  Burns died of heart failure in 1990, at age 65, in a hospital in Atlanta, Georgia, before finishing the manuscript, and the uncompleted novel was published in 1992 along with her notes.

References

Works
Cold Sassy Tree, published in 1984

External links
Olive Ann Burns , in The New Georgia Encyclopedia
Olive Ann Burns Collection at Stuart A. Rose Manuscript, Archives, and Rare Book Library

Novelists from Georgia (U.S. state)
UNC Hussman School of Journalism and Media alumni
1924 births
1990 deaths
People from Banks County, Georgia
American women journalists
American women novelists
People from Commerce, Georgia
20th-century American novelists
20th-century American women writers
The Atlanta Journal-Constitution people
20th-century American non-fiction writers
Pseudonymous women writers
Mercer University alumni
20th-century pseudonymous writers